Chemical Research in Toxicology is a peer-reviewed scientific journal, published since 1988 by the American Chemical Society. It is currently abstracted and indexed in Chemical Abstracts Service, Scopus, EBSCOhost, PubMed, CABI, Science Citation Index Expanded, and SwetsWise.

As of January 2018, the editor-in-chief is Shana Sturla (Institute of Food, Nutrition, and Health
Department of Health Sciences and Technology
ETH Zurich).

According to the Journal Citation Reports, the journal had a 2020 impact factor of 3.739.

References

External links 
 

American Chemical Society academic journals
Toxicology journals
Publications established in 1988
Monthly journals
English-language journals